Lyndon B. Johnson (1908–1973) was the President of the United States from 1963 to 1969.

LBJ may also refer to:

 LBJ: The Early Years, 1987 television movie
 LBJ (1991 film), a television documentary film
 LBJ (2016 film), film directed by Rob Reiner
 Lady Bird Johnson (1912–2007), wife of Lyndon B. Johnson
 LeBron James (born 1984), American basketball player
 Little brown job, informal name for any small brown bird
 Long Bình Jail, a U.S. Army stockade at Long Binh Post during the Vietnam War 
 Long Binh Post, also known as Long Binh Junction, a U.S. Army military installation during the Vietnam War 
 Komodo Airport (IATA code: LBJ)
 "Little Brown Jug" (song), an American folk song popularized by Glenn Miller
 LBJ, a Cuban anti-imperialist satire film directed by Santiago Álvarez
 "Initials (L.B.J.)", a song from the musical Hair

See also
 Facilities named after Lyndon Johnson